Kiffa is a department of Assaba Region in Mauritania.

List of municipalities in the department 
The Kiffa department is made up of following municipalities:

 Aghoratt
 El Melgue
 Kiffa
 Kouroudjel
 Legrane
 Nouamline.

In 2000, the entire population of the Kiffa Department has a total of 76 779 inhabitants  (35 363 men and 41 416 women).

References 

Departments of Mauritania